"Come a Little Closer" is a song by American rock band Cage the Elephant. Written by lead singer Matthew Shultz and produced by Jay Joyce, it was released as the lead single from the band's third studio album Melophobia on August 13, 2013. It topped the Billboard Alternative Songs chart in the United States, giving the band their fourth number-one hit on the chart.

Background
Cage the Elephant lead singer Matthew Shultz wrote "Come a Little Closer", taking inspiration from an occasion in which he woke up in a São Paulo hotel in the early morning and opened his window to watch the sunrise over the favelas. Finding the makeshift housing comparable to an anthill, he soon found himself wondering what each soul inside each borough felt, whether it be heartache, love, loss or joy.

Music video
The music video for "Come a Little Closer" was directed by Matthew Schultz and released on November 12, 2013. A mix of animation and live-action footage, it depicts the members of Cage the Elephant being transported to an alien planet and trying to escape from several monstrous beings, and in Schultz's case, having to navigate out of the stomach of a giant whale and evade being devoured by a group of birds. Schultz then rides a flaming lion and makes his way to a different planet made of skulls, traveling into its core and managing to escape death by destroying it. Scenes of the band performing the song is interspersed throughout.

Track listing
 Digital download
 "Come a Little Closer" – 3:49

 7" vinyl
 "Come a Little Closer" – 3:49
 "Baby Blue" – 3:57

Charts

Weekly charts

Year-end charts

Certifications

Release history

References

External links

2013 singles
Cage the Elephant songs
Song recordings produced by Jay Joyce
Songs written by Matt Shultz (singer)
2013 songs
RCA Records singles
Rock ballads